Anthony Allison may refer to:

 Anthony Allison (soccer) (born 1987), Liberian-born American soccer player
 Anthony Allison (politician), American politician in the New Mexico House of Representatives
 Anthony Clifford Allison (1925–2014), South African geneticist and medical scientist